Gortva is a village and municipality in the Rimavská Sobota District of the Banská Bystrica Region of southern Slovakia.

History
In historical records, the village was first mentioned in 1326 (1326 Gurtuatu, 1383 Kisfalud), when it belonged to Feledy feudatories. In the 16th century, it suffered Turkish devastations. From 1938 to 1944, it was annexed by Hungary.

Genealogical resources

The records for genealogical research are available at the state archive "Statny Archiv in Banska Bystrica, Slovakia"

 Roman Catholic church records (births/marriages/deaths): 1762-1897 (parish B)
 Reformated church records (births/marriages/deaths): 1786-1863 (parish A)

See also
 List of municipalities and towns in Slovakia

External links
https://web.archive.org/web/20071217080336/http://www.statistics.sk/mosmis/eng/run.html
http://www.gortva.gemer.org/
http://www.gortva.ou.sk/
http://www.e-obce.sk/obec/gortva/gortva.html
Surnames of living people in Gortva

Villages and municipalities in Rimavská Sobota District